Přísečná is a municipality and village in Český Krumlov District in the South Bohemian Region of the Czech Republic. It has about 200 inhabitants.

Notable people
Božena Böhmová (1925–2020), actress

References

Villages in Český Krumlov District